Pariyoush Ganji  (born in 1945) is an Iranian painter, designer, and educator. Her artwork and design has been influenced by traditional Persian art. Ganji lives in Tehran.

Early life and education 
Pariyoush Ganji was born in 1945, in Tabriz, Iran. In 1948, Ganji’s family moved to Tehran. When she was age 12, she participated in an art competition, which inspired her to study art. 

Her school years at Behzad Art Academy, from 1963 to 1966, played an important role in shaping her visual language. Ganji was classmates with several known artists, including Bahman Mohassess, Ahmad Shamloo, Sohrab Sepehri, and Gholamhossein Sa’edi. She completed a formal art education at the Girls' School of Fine Arts, majoring in painting. She was a student of Mahmoud Farshchian, who is famous for his work in Persian miniature painting.

She studied in London, England. She participated in Saint Martin's School of Art classes, and took art programs at the Sir John Cass School of Art, Architecture and Design. In 1970, she attended Chelsea College of Arts and graduated after three years. Pariyoush Ganji started by selling her art work before going to Chelsea College of Arts. She worked on "The Safavid Tiles of Isfahan" as her thesis, which is inspired by original designs and paintings of Iranian art. Although Ganji studied in other countries, she has maintained a sense of Persian culture throughout her artistic journey.

Career 
Ganji has sold some of her designs to textile-printing factories. She traveled to Germany in 1974, where she was hired as a designer for Dura Tufing GMBH. As she was in close contact with expressionist painters, she brought fresh visions to her designs. That was an opportunity for her as well to expand her skills and techniques.

In 1975, Ganji moved to France and took a course at Ecole des Beaux Arts in Paris, France. She worked on “the kinetic movement of esoteric arabesque designs of Persian carpets, inspired by the dancing human form”.

Teaching 
Ganji returned to Iran, in 1976, and collaborated with the center for the Intellectual Development of Children and Young Adults as well as curating an exhibition of their paintings and illustrating a book. She was married and had two kids before she went back to Iran to teach.

In 1986, Ganji taught at art schools in Tehran. She researched on the visual art of Far East, to find the influential elements of Sassanid Patterns on Japanese visual art through the Silk Road. Pariyoush Ganji has taught at places such as Alzahra University, Islamic Azad University, and University of Tehran. Also, she has been a member in organizations such as Tehran Cultural Heritage Organization, Contemporary Arts Museum, Tehran’s Jury Memberships Contemporary Drawing, Handicrafts, and Tourism Organization.

Work in Japan 
Ganji traveled to Japan in 1996 through the invitation of the Cultural Foundation of Japan, she was studying the influences of Iranian patterns on Japanese textiles. It was in Japan where she learned about a Japanese technique called Sumi-e or ink wash painting, which she worked to master. That was when she produced some paintings that were, “blends of minimal Japanese Shojis and ornamental Persian windows”.

Series 
She stayed there for six months. A year later, Ganji worked on a new series called, Red. The Red series were a selection of painting with red on black backgrounds. In the early 2000s, Ganji started working on the series called Night Windows, that replaced red color with purple. Night Windows are described to be new ways to historical occurrences to show the light through the darkness shaped by the many layers of purple.  She then continued to work on other series called Roses, Day Windows, and Water, each with a different and continual direction for “searching the light".

Exhibitions 
Pariyoush Ganji’s work has been exhibited around the world. She has had around twenty exhibitions and some of her paintings are an important part of the collections in Japan, United Kingdom, and the United States. Throughout the four periods of Ganji’s work, Ganji’s paintings have been exhibited not only in Iran, but also in England, Japan, United States, Germany, Kazakhstan, Saudi Arabi, Kyrgyzstan, Kuwait, Uzbekistan, and Switzerland.

Awards 
 2015 – Order of the Rising Sun ((旭日章 Kyokujitsu-shō)) award, government of Japan

See also 
 List of Iranian women artists

References

Living people
1945 births
People from Tabriz
Iranian women painters
20th-century Iranian women artists
21st-century Iranian women artists